The Municipality of Shoal Lake is a former rural municipality (RM) in the Canadian province of Manitoba. It was originally incorporated as a rural municipality on January 1, 2011. It ceased on January 1, 2015 as a result of its provincially mandated amalgamation with the RM of Strathclair to form the Rural Municipality of Yellowhead.

The former Municipality of Shoal Lake is located in the Westman Region of the province. Its formation on January 1, 2011 was a result of an amalgamation of the former Town of Shoal Lake and the former Rural Municipality of Shoal Lake. It had a population of 555 according to the Canada 2006 Census.

Communities 
Kelloe
Oakburn
Shoal Lake

References

External links 
 Municipality of Shoal Lake (copy archived January 5, 2015)
 Shoal Lake, MB Community Profile
 Map of Shoal Lake R.M. at Statcan

Shoal Lake
Populated places disestablished in 2015